Paul Yaw Boateng, Baron Boateng (born 14 June 1951) is a British Labour Party politician, who was the Member of Parliament (MP) for Brent South from 1987 to 2005, becoming the UK's first Black Cabinet Minister in May 2002, when he was appointed as Chief Secretary to the Treasury.  Following his departure from the House of Commons, he served as the British High Commissioner to South Africa from March 2005 to May 2009.  He was introduced as a member of the House of Lords on 1 July 2010.

Background and early life
Boateng was born in Hackney, London, of mixed Ghanaian and Scottish heritage; his family later moved to Ghana when Boateng was four years old. His father, Kwaku Boateng, was a lawyer and Cabinet Minister during Kwame Nkrumah's regime. Boateng attended Ghana International School and the Accra Academy, a high school in Ghana. Boateng's life in Ghana came to an abrupt end after his father went to jail in 1966 following a military coup, which toppled the Ghanaian government. His father was imprisoned without trial for four years. Boateng, then aged 15, and his sister, Rosemary, fled to the UK with their mother.

They settled in Hemel Hempstead, where he attended Apsley Grammar School. He later read law at the University of Bristol where he resided at Wills Hall and was a member of the Barneys Club. He began his career in civil rights, originally as a solicitor, though he later retrained as a barrister. He worked primarily on social and community cases, starting under renowned civil rights advocate Benedict Birnberg, involving women's rights, housing and police complaints, including a period from 1977 to 1981 as the legal advisor for the Scrap Sus Campaign. Boateng was also an executive member of the National Council for Civil Liberties. He represented Cherry Groce, a mother of six who was shot and paralysed by a police officer during a raid on her home, in search for her son. He became a partner at the firm B. M. Birnberg & Co., and as a barrister, he practised at Eight King's Bench Walk.

Political career
In 1981, Boateng was elected to represent Walthamstow on Greater London Council, of which Ken Livingstone became leader shortly after the election. As chair of the GLC's police committee and vice-chair of its ethnic minorities committee, he advocated greater accountability in the Metropolitan Police and spoke out against racism in relation to their dealings with the African Caribbean and Asian communities.

Member of Parliament
He unsuccessfully stood as a parliamentary candidate for Hertfordshire West (which included his former home town of Hemel Hempstead) at the 1983 general election. He was elected at the general election of 1987, when he became the MP for Brent South in succession to Laurence Pavitt, being one of the first four non-white British MPs, elected alongside fellow Labour Party Black Sections members Bernie Grant, Diane Abbott and Keith Vaz. During his victory speech he said: "We can never be free in Brent until South Africa is free too." He then declared, "Today Brent South, tomorrow Soweto!"

Like many other members of Labour's left-wing in the 1980s, he became more moderate under the leadership of Neil Kinnock. For instance, he refused to join the Parliamentary Black Caucus founded by Diane Abbott, Bernie Grant, Keith Vaz and Lord David Pitt, Baron Pitt of Hampstead in 1988, which eventually collapsed. Kinnock rewarded Boateng by making him a junior Treasury spokesman in 1989, and then the first Black person to join the front bench as a party spokesperson. His portfolio included economics, industrial strategies and corporate responsibility. In 1992, he became shadow minister for the Lord Chancellor's Department, a post he held until the 1997 general election, where he was a strong advocate for increasing pro bono legal services among UK law firms.

Ministerial career
With Labour's landslide victory in 1997, Boateng became the UK's first black government minister as Parliamentary Under-Secretary for Health, where he was responsible for social services, mental health and disabled people. In that position, he published guidelines to end the denial of adoptions purely on the basis of race.

In 1998, Boateng became a Minister of State at the Home Office and subsequently became Number 2 Minister there. He was made a Privy Councillor in 1999. He earned a reputation for being tough on crime, particularly with regard to aggressive begging on the streets. He also worked with Eric Holder, then United States Deputy Attorney-General, and Louis Freeh, then Director of the FBI, on issues related to international drug trafficking and interdiction.

His portfolio was expanded in 2000, and he became the first Minister for Young People, where his priority was to listen to and be a voice for Britain's youth. He launched the Youth, Citizenship and Social Change programme, then the UK's largest research project designed to examine social exclusion and promoting citizenship among young people. He also played a leading role in establishing and launching the £450,000,000 Children's Fund designed to tackle child poverty. Boateng's ministerial colleagues encouraged him to stand as the Labour candidate to be the Mayor of London; however, he ruled himself out and strongly criticised his former GLC colleague Ken Livingstone. Boateng supported the candidacy of Frank Dobson, with whom he had served in the Department of Health.

Cabinet history
In 2001, he was made Financial Secretary to the Treasury, and was promoted to the position of Chief Secretary to the Treasury in May 2002, becoming Britain's first black cabinet minister. He was quoted as saying "My colour is part of me but I do not choose to be defined by my colour."  His appointment was greeted with praise by civil rights activists who said that his appointment gave hope to young black youths, and would inspire them to become involved in politics. To commemorate this historic achievement, Parliament commissioned a painting of Boateng by Jonathan Yeo, which is displayed in the collection of 21st Century Parliamentarians.

In his role as Chief Secretary to the Treasury, he was responsible for finalising the Spending Review of 2002 and leading the Spending Review of 2004. Boateng, coordinating with Sir Peter Gershon's report, announced in 2004 the government's efficiency programme to save over £20,000,000,000 in the public sector.

Boateng played a leading role in coordinating the Every Child Matters policy paper, which called for the reform of children's services, including greater accountability and coordination among government agencies. He was also a passionate advocate for increasing development aid to Africa and the developing nations. Foreshadowing his future role, he made numerous trips to Africa, meeting with business and government leaders in an effort to highlight the fact that international aid and the Millennium Development Goals were key priorities for the government. Boateng also assisted Gordon Brown in drafting the Africa Commission report, which called for increasing aid to Africa from Western nations to $50 billion a year.

In March 2005, Boateng announced that he would not stand for re-election as an MP at the general election. Dawn Butler was selected by the Constituency Labour Party to replace him and was elected in Brent South.

High Commissioner to South Africa
Due to Boateng's passion and enthusiasm for the government's Africa Commission Report and his associations with African leaders Tony Blair named him to be the next High Commissioner to South Africa for a term of four years, making him the first black ambassador in British history. Many Africans praised the appointment, stating that it was an important symbolic break from Britain's colonial past and saw it as a symbol of Tony Blair's commitment to the continent. Boateng is credited with building a close relationship with the African National Congress government in South Africa, and it was reported that he privately worked to bring together bitter rivals in the crisis in Zimbabwe, although he publicly condemned the Zimbabwean government's illegal occupation of land from white farmers and the resulting turmoil, which Boateng labelled a "human rights crisis."
He has also addressed the World Economic Forum on issues concerning Africa. In 2008, he participated in a number of talks with political leaders in the United States to encourage them to support the Doha Development Round trade negotiations that would open Western markets to goods from Africa and other developing countries.

Appointment to the House of Lords
On 28 May 2010, it was announced in the 2010 Dissolution Honours that Boateng would become a member of the House of Lords. On 27 June 2010 he was created Baron Boateng, of Akyem in the Republic of Ghana and of Wembley in the London Borough of Brent and was introduced to the Lords on 1 July 2010; he was supported by Lord Ouseley and Lord Janner. His maiden speech to the House of Lords highlighted the needs of poor and disadvantaged children, both in rural and urban areas. He called on the Government to examine the impact that the Budget and forthcoming Spending Review would have on children at risk.
In December 2011, he initiated a debate in the House of Lords to discuss cuts in funding to the Citizens Advice Bureau centres, which Lord Boateng vehemently opposed.

He is a member of Labour Friends of Israel.

Roles outside politics

Boateng is an active Methodist and is a lay preacher; he served as a Methodist delegate to the World Council of Churches and as Vice-Moderator of its program to combat racism. During the South African General Elections of 1994 which ended apartheid, he was a member of the delegation sent by the Association of Western European Parliamentarians Against Apartheid to monitor the elections.

He previously served on the board of the English National Opera (1984 to 1997) and the English Touring Opera (1993 to 1997). In 1993, he wrote the foreword to the HarperCollins collected works edition of Jane Austen's Sense and Sensibility. He has been a commentator and television presenter on programmes including Channel 4's Nothing But The Truth and BBC Radio 4's Looking Forward to the Past.

In 2011 he was a non-executive Director of Aegis Defence Services, a private security, military and risk management company founded by controversial arms dealer Lt Colonel Tim Spicer, who was at the heart of the Sandline affair but had left by 2013.

He was serving on the executive board of the international Christian charity Food for the Hungry, in 2012 and is a trustee of the Planet Earth Institute along with chairman Álvaro Sobrinho.

Lord Boateng is a vice-president of The London Library.

In 2014, Lord Boateng became the chair of charity BookAid International.

In 2019, Lord Boateng became Chancellor of the University of Greenwich.

Honours and awards
In 1988, the Southern Christian Leadership Conference honoured Boateng as the recipient of the Dr. Martin Luther King Jr. Award for his contributions to the field of civil rights.

In 2003 he was named on the list of "100 Great Black Britons".

He received honorary Doctor of Law degrees from West London University on 25 July 2018, Lincoln University (Pennsylvania) in 2004 and the University of Bristol in 2007.

Personal life
Boateng is married to Janet, a former councillor in Lambeth. They have two sons and three daughters. In November 2011, Boateng's son Benjamin, then aged 27, was jailed for almost four years for a sex attack on a woman.

See also
 Black British elite, the class that Boateng belongs to

References

Further reading

Tim Walker, "A Diplomat Who Could Yet Be the British Obama", The Spectator, 12 March 2008
Parliament House Magazine: Breaking Down Barriers (Interview with Lord Boateng)
Interview with British High Commissioner Paul Boateng Regarding Doha and International Trade
Lord Boateng - UK Parliament Biography
Paul Boateng, "Prevention is Better Than Cure", New Statesman, 28 April 2012.
UK Web Archive: Website for Paul Boateng MP (2005)
"Every Child Matters: Speech by Chief Secretary to the Treasury, Paul Boateng MP, at Toynbee Hall", 20 October 2003.
Paul Boateng Reports on Children's and Young People's Unit
Paul Boateng: We Understand the Vital Importance of Feedback
"Boateng to step down at election", BBC News, 14 March 2005.
Paul Boateng - Aristotle profile from The Guardian
Paul Boateng - profile from TheyWorkForYou.com
New High Commissioner to South Africa - FCO Announcement
 United Kingdom High Commission to South Africa: introduction of the High Commissioner Paul Boateng; CV of Paul Boateng
Artistic Portrait of Paul Boateng by Jonathan Yeo

|-

|-

|-

|-

|-

1951 births
Living people
Alumni of the Accra Academy
Alumni of the University of Bristol
Ambassadors and High Commissioners of the United Kingdom to South Africa
High Commissioners of the United Kingdom to Eswatini
High Commissioners of the United Kingdom to Lesotho
English people of Ghanaian descent
English people of Scottish descent
Ghanaian people of Scottish descent
Labour Party (UK) MPs for English constituencies
Labour Party (UK) life peers
Life peers created by Elizabeth II
Members of the Greater London Council
Members of the Privy Council of the United Kingdom
National Council for Civil Liberties people
People from Hackney Central
People from Hemel Hempstead
Politics of the London Borough of Brent
Labour Friends of Israel
Politics of Dacorum
UK MPs 1987–1992
UK MPs 1992–1997
UK MPs 1997–2001
UK MPs 2001–2005
Black British MPs
Methodist local preachers
Chief Secretaries to the Treasury